Daniel Berk Log House  is a historic log cabin located on Maiden Creek in Albany Township, Berks County, Pennsylvania.   It was built in two sections; one about 1740 and the second in the late 1700s.  The older section is a -story, rectangular log building measuring 20 feet by 22 feet.  It has a gable roof and sits on a stone foundation.  The newer section is a -story stone addition measuring 20 feet by 22 feet.

It was listed on the National Register of Historic Places in 1977.

References

Log cabins in the United States
Houses on the National Register of Historic Places in Pennsylvania
Houses completed in 1760
Houses in Berks County, Pennsylvania
National Register of Historic Places in Berks County, Pennsylvania
Log buildings and structures on the National Register of Historic Places in Pennsylvania